Frederik Kastrud Petersen (9 November 1759 – 22 August 1825) was a Norwegian painter known primarily for his portraits.

Biography 
Petersen was born at Ringebu in Oppland, Norway.   His father, Peter Kastrud (1732–1799) was a woodcarver and rosemaler from Fåberg. He received his first art instruction working with his father in Gudbrandsdalen and Østerdalen; learning decorative and figure painting. In 1788, with financial support from Bernt Anker, he was able to go to Copenhagen and study with Jens Juel at the Royal Danish Academy of Fine Arts. After completing his studies, he returned to Norway, although Juel had advised him to travel abroad. He continued to work for his father and Anker,  copied works by the Old Masters, and often stayed in  Christiania (now Oslo). 

In 1799, he settled in Tønsberg  where he took citizenship in 1803. In addition to oil paintings, he did much of what would now be called "handicraft" work, as the concept of painter-as-artist was not yet established in Norway. His social status must have been high, however, because he was one of the citizens who participated in choosing a local representative to serve in the Norwegian Constituent Assembly of 1814.

He moved to Strømsø in 1816 and received citizenship there as a Master Painter in 1821. In addition to his canvases, he did altarpieces at Sør-Fron Church and Sandar Church in Sandefjord. He died during 1825 in Drammen.

Personal life
He was married in 1792 to Siri Olsdatter Bierke (1767–1837).  Their son, Peter (1794–1858), also became a portrait painter.

References

External links

The Petersen Painting Dynasty @ Terra Buskerud.

1759 births
1825 deaths
18th-century Norwegian painters
18th-century male artists
19th-century Norwegian painters
Norwegian portrait painters
Norwegian landscape painters
People from Ringebu
Royal Danish Academy of Fine Arts alumni
Norwegian male painters
19th-century Norwegian male artists